Alice Cecilia Linh Svensson (born 11 July 1991) is a Vietnamese-born Swedish singer. At the age of ten months, Svensson was adopted from her home country Vietnam, and moved to Sweden with her family, and she has since lived in Hedesunda. She finished as runner-up in Idol 2008 and later took part in Melodifestivalen 2017 with the song "Running with Lions".

Beginnings
Alice was a member of the pop group Popcorn, releasing a record with them at the age of 13. She has participated in a number of talent shows like Super Troupers in 2004, talent show Joker 2006 where Svensson became first-runner up, in Talang show in 2007, and the TV4 children's show Lattjo lajban. She won the talent show Popkorn 2007.

Idol 2008
Svensson took part in Idol 2008, the Swedish version of Pop Idol. She sang the following songs:
Audition - "Ain't No Other Man"
First qualifying week - "Beautiful Disaster"
Second qualifying week - "Fighter"
Third qualifying week - "Beautiful Disaster"
5-års theme - "These Words"
1990s theme - "Ironic"
ABBA theme - "Lay All Your Love on Me"
Various theme - "Min kärlek"
Rock theme - "Heaven's on Fire"
Soul theme - "I Say a Little Prayer
Duets - "You're the One That I Want"
Love theme - "Because of You" and "Crazy in Love"
Gospel theme - "Shackles" and "Independent Woman"
Jury selection - "Keep This Fire Burning" and "Girlfriend"
Final - "So What" (own choice), "Heaven's on Fire" (viewers' choice) and "With Every Bit of Me" (final song).

On 14 November 2008, Swedish media reported that her rendition of "Heaven's on Fire" had been posted on the hard rock band Kiss' official homepage by members of the group. She finished first runner-up to eventual winner Kevin Borg.

After Idol
In May 2009, she signed a recording contract and released her debut solo single "Lady Luck". In 2009, she also collaborated with the Swedish singer Jonathan Fagerlund in the latter's second album Welcome to My World where she was featured in Fagerlund's song "Save Our Yesterdays".

In 2017, she participated in Melodifestivalen with the song "Running with Lions". She placed fifth in the fourth heat and failed to advance further in the competition.

Discography

Singles
With Popcorn
"Popcorn"
Solo singles

Filmography

References

People from Hanoi
Vietnamese emigrants to Sweden
1991 births
Living people
Idol (Swedish TV series) participants
Swedish adoptees
Swedish people of Vietnamese descent
21st-century Swedish singers
21st-century Swedish women singers
Melodifestivalen contestants of 2017